Courting Across the Court is a 1911 American silent short romantic comedy film. The film stars William Garwood.

External links

1910s romantic comedy films
Thanhouser Company films
1911 films
American romantic comedy films
American silent short films
American black-and-white films
1911 short films
1911 comedy films
1910s American films
Silent romantic comedy films
Silent American comedy films